McCalister is a surname. Notable people with the surname include:

Alex McCalister (born 1993), American football player
Tim McCalister (born 1964), American basketball player

See also
McCallister, surname
McAlester (disambiguation), includes a list of people with surname McAlester